Island Nation 2 is the second season of the Taiwanese political drama, Island Nation, based on Taiwan's transition from an authoritarian state to a democracy in the 1990s. The second season debuted on September 12, 2021.

Synopsis
Island Nation 2 presents a fictionalized account of Taiwan from 1995 to 1996 amidst Taiwan's arrival at its first-ever direct presidential election, featuring political infighting, rise of criminal elements in politics, and soldiers fighting for their lives under the Third Taiwan Strait Crisis. They all represent Taiwan's spirit of “One island, one destiny.”

Episodes

References

External links
 

  - Season 2 English subtitled episodes

2021 television seasons
Television shows filmed in Taiwan
Taiwanese drama television series
Television series set in 1994
Television series set in 1995
Television series set in 1996
2